Bozani may refer to several places:

 Bozani (river), in Bihor County, Romania
 the Kurdish name for Ayn Issa, Syria,